Oleksandr Arturovich Shymko, born 4 August 1977 in Borshchiv, Ukraine, is a Ukrainian composer and pianist.

Education and musical career
Oleksandr Shymko was born on August 4, 1977 in the town of Borshchiv in the Ternopil region of Ukraine. In 1998 he studied composition under  at the Kyiv Conservatory, graduating in 2002. From 2002 to 2005 he continued his studies at he academy as a post-graduate.

Shymko has been a member of the National Union of Composers of Ukraine since 2003; From 2004 to 2010, he was the chairman of the union's Kyiv youth association, he was awarded the Kyiv Mayor's Prize, and was awarded the  scholarship by the Polish Ministry of Culture. In 2005 he began studying composition with Aleksander Lasoń at the Karol Szymanowski Academy of Music, in Katowice, Poland. In 2006 he was awarded a grant by the Ernst von Siemens Foundation. 

In 2007, he was won the Levko Revutsky Prize, awarded by the Ministry of Culture of Ukraine. 

Performances 
Many of Shymko's works have been performed in festivals, as “Music Season’s premieres” (2004, 2006 Kyiv), International Festival “Kyiv Music Fest” (2005), the 19th International Festival “Warsaw Musical Meetings”, 4th International Festival “New music”- Festiwal Muzyki Nowej (Bytom, Poland), 5th Summer Festival in Rycerka (Poland), "Contem-ucha"—a series of concerts of contemporary music in Lodz Philharmony (Poland), and others. 

In 2008 he was  the organizer and musical director of the "Musical Tribune of Kyiv Youth" festival.

The , Ukrainian Radio Symphony Orchestra, and the Archi Chamber Orchestra have all performed Shymko's works.

Selected works

Ballet

Orchestral
 Symphony No.1Trilogy of Life (20042005)
 Symphony No.2 Genesis (2006)
 Symphony No.3 Elysium (2010)
 Symphony No.4 (2013).
 Concerto No.1 for piano and orchestra (20012002)
 Concerto No.2 for piano and orchestra (20062007)
 Concerto for violin and symphony orchestra (2012)
 Concerto for violin, viola and symphony orchestra (2012)

Chamber orchestral music
 Hymn of Solitude for soprano and chamber orchestra (2007), text by Halina Poświatowska
 "Kallisti" for violin and string orchestra (2009)
 "Etnica" for trumpet and chamber orchestra (2009)
 "Elegium" for piano and string orchestra (2010)
 "Equilibrium" for authentic voice and chamber orchestra (2011)
 "OffLife" for electronics and chamber orchestra (2013)
 "Passion songs" for soprano and chamber orchestra (2013)

Chamber music
 Two Birds for two flutes (2004)
 Silence for piano and harp (2005)
 The Book of Night Secrets for flute, viola and harp (2005)
 "Ecstatics" for flute, oboe, clarinet, violin, viola, cello and piano (2010)
 "Birth" for piano and string quartet (2010)
 "Overground music" for soprano saxophone, violin, cello and piano (2013)
 "No Noise Music" for soprano, two flutes, oboe, clarinet, string quartet and piano (2014)

Music for piano
 Storm Petrel (1997)
 Sharme (2002)
 Space (2007)

Choral
 Hymn to the Sun for chorus and orchestra (2003), text by Maximilian Voloshin
 Songs of the Sea for a cappella chorus (2006–2007), text by 
 Chronos for chorus and orchestra (2008)

References

External links 
Official website (in English, Ukrainian and Russian)
YouTube channel

Ukrainian classical composers
Musicians from Kyiv
1977 births
Living people
Ballet composers
Composers for violin
Composers for piano
21st-century classical composers
Postminimalist composers
Contemporary classical composers
Male classical composers
21st-century male musicians